Fordo or Fordow is a village in Fordo Rural District, Kahak District, Qom County, Qom Province, Iran. It is located near the Shia holy city of Qom.  At the 2006 census, its population was 732, in 230 families.

Fordu, Fordo, Furdu or Fardu a village with more than 100 houses. Headwaters of the Furdu river. Kuhistan subdivision of Qom. Fordo is 26 miles to the south of Qom. Fordo is situated in a deep glen between Hasan Aqa and Furdu peaks. Fordo's sheep are celebrated for their milk.

The village of Fordo is believed to have the largest percentage of fighters killed in the Iran–Iraq War, lasting from September 1980 to August 1988.

In September 2009, it was revealed that Iran had a second uranium enrichment plant near the village of Fordo.

The late Iranian actor and director Fathali Oveisi was born in the village.

References

Populated places in Qom Province